Chappaqua is a hamlet and census-designated place in the town of New Castle, in northern Westchester County, New York. The hamlet is served by the Chappaqua station of the Metro-North Railroad's Harlem Line. In the New York State Legislature it is within the New York State Assembly's 93rd district and the New York Senate's 40th district. In Congress the village is in New York's 17th District.

Chappaqua was founded by a group of Quakers in the 1730s and was the home of Horace Greeley, New-York Tribune editor and U.S. congressman. Since the late 1990s, former President Bill Clinton and former Secretary of State Hillary Clinton have lived there.

History
In the early 1730s, a group of Quakers moved north from Purchase, New York, to settle in present-day Chappaqua. They built their homes on Quaker Road (more recently, Quaker Street) and held their meetings at the home of Abel Weeks. Their meeting house was built in 1753 and still holds weekly meetings each Sunday. The area around the meeting house, known as Old Chappaqua Historic District, was added to the National Register of Historic Places in 1974.  Horace Greeley's home, known as Rehoboth and built by Greeley himself, still stands in Chappaqua.  It is also listed on the National Register of Historic Places along with Chappaqua Railroad Depot and Depot Plaza, Church of Saint Mary the Virgin and Greeley Grove, and the Greeley House.

Various spellings were used for the name they heard Native Americans use for their valley and hillside. It was an Algonquian word, shah-pah-ka, and it meant "the rustling land" or "the rattling land," or a place where nothing is heard but the rustling of the wind in the leaves. The Quakers spelled it Shapiqua, Shapaqua, Shapequa, Shappaqua, and, finally, Chappaqua. Their meeting was often referred to as the Shapequa Meeting as early as 1745.

On March 18, 1791, the government of New York decided to split the overly large town of North Castle (jokingly called "the two saddlebags") into two smaller towns, one of which was named New Castle.  The border was drawn from the southwest corner of Bedford to the northeast edge of Mount Pleasant.  New Castle's borders have remained the same since 1791, except for a small piece of land received from Somers in 1846 and the secession of Mount Kisco in 1978.

Chappaqua had great streams such as the Saw Mill River and Roaring Brook. These bodies of water powered mills to crush corn and press oil from beans. The eastern half of Chappaqua was very suitable for farming. The majority of the Quaker settlers of Chappaqua were farmers. The popular farming industry also helped give way to Chappaqua's high milk production. Other popular industries from Chappaqua included shoes, hardware, vinegar, pickles, eyeglasses, and furniture. Many early homes and businesses were demolished in the 1904 Chappaqua tornado.

In 1846 when the New York and Harlem Railroad extended through Chappaqua, business became centered on the new train station. These businesses included a hotel, livery stables, a public library, and various stores and small factories. The railroad enabled commuters to travel to New York City and back each day.

Geography

Parts of the Chappaqua ZIP Code area are located in the towns of Mount Kisco, New Castle, Mount Pleasant, Yorktown, and Bedford, and the hamlet of Millwood. Parts of the Chappaqua Central School District include homes in other zip codes, such as 10570, the Pleasantville zip code.

Climate

Demographics

As of the 2010 census, following a major revision to the delineation of its boundaries by the Census Bureau, the population was 1,436. At the 2000 census, with very different census-defined boundaries, Chappaqua had a population of 9,468.

As of the census of 2010, there were 1,434 people residing in Chappaqua. According to the 2015-2019 American Community Survey 5-Year Estimates, there are 595 housing units and the median household income is $250,000+. The racial makeup of the CDP was 76.1% White alone, 0% Black or African American alone, 0% Native American alone, 22.6% Asian alone, 0% Native Hawaiian and other Pacific Islander alone, 0% some other race alone, and 1.3% from two or more races.

According to the 2010 census], the median age was 39 years, with 3.8% of the population under 5, 81.6% 18 and older, and 10% 65 and older. Males had a median income of $207,083 versus $128,750 for females. 0% of families were below the poverty line. 6.6% of people old enough had a high school or equivalent degree of education, 5.8 had some college but no degree, 4% had an associate degree, 37.3% had a bachelor's degree, and 46.3% had a graduate or professional degree.

Nationwide, Chappaqua ranks 42nd among the 100 highest-income places in the United States (with at least 1,000 households). In 2008, CNNMoney listed Chappaqua fifth in their list of "25 top-earning towns." Chappaqua 2007 estimated median household income was $198,000.

Crime
Although Chappaqua's crime rate is far below the national average, the area has had a few high-profile murders. In 1996, a battle between a lottery winner and his former lover over custody of their 5-year-old child resulted in a gun battle; the winner was acquitted of the murder of his former lover on the basis of self-defense, and convicted of the shooting of the woman's father. In November 2006 a disbarred attorney drove the body of his severely injured wife to Northern Westchester Hospital, claiming that the couple had been ambushed and shot in the nearby town of Millwood. She died soon after. For over a year, police expressed skepticism about the husband's account and did not rule him out as a suspect. In December 2007 the man was charged with his wife's murder after trying to collect on life insurance policies. Carlos Perez-Olivo was convicted October 4, 2008 for the murder of his wife, Peggy Perez-Olivo, who had been working as a teaching assistant at Douglas Grafflin Elementary School in Chappaqua.

Arts and culture

Notable structures

 The Chappaqua Friends Meeting House, circa 1753, is the oldest extant Quaker meeting house in Westchester County, and is a contributing property to the Old Chappaqua Historic District.
 America's first concrete barn was completed by Horace Greeley on his Chappaqua farm in 1856. It was also one of the first concrete buildings ever built in the U.S. Greeley's daughter and son-in-law later remodeled it into their house and named it Rehoboth.
 The world headquarters of Reader's Digest was in Chappaqua. The exterior featured statues of Pegasus.
 Part of the original structure of one of Horace Greeley's homes is part of the present-day New Castle Historical Society.
 The Shamberg House, designed by Richard Meier, was built in Chappaqua in 1974.
A Georgian-inspired mansion in Chappaqua served as the shooting location for the 2022 horror film Bodies Bodies Bodies.

Education

Small, one-room schoolhouses devoid of windows were prevalent in the 1800s. In the Chappaqua region, there were eight such schoolhouses.  These small schools prevailed until around 1870, when the Quakers built a large school called the Chappaqua Mountain Institute on Quaker Street.  In the year 1885 the school caught fire, and much refurbishing was done, with the addition of two new wings.  It was sold in 1908 and the school's property is now owned by Children's Aid.

Around 1928, Robert E. Bell Middle School, known at the time as Horace Greeley School, was built. The present day Horace Greeley High School was built in 1957. The three elementary schools in Chappaqua were completed over a twenty-year period: Roaring Brook School in 1951, Douglas G. Grafflin in 1962, and Westorchard in 1971.

In 2003, after the opening of the new middle school, Seven Bridges, and the moving of the fifth grade from Chappaqua's elementary schools to the middle schools, the district added a full day kindergarten.

Schools currently operating in Chappaqua include:
 Robert E. Bell MS
 Douglas Grafflin ES
 Seven Bridges MS
 Roaring Brook ES
 Horace Greeley High School
 Westorchard ES

Infrastructure

Emergency services
Emergency medical services and fire protection are provided by volunteer agencies. The Chappaqua Volunteer Ambulance Corps provides basic life support services to most of New Castle, including Chappaqua. The hamlet is protected by the New Castle Police Department, which also provides first-response services for medical emergencies. The volunteer-based Chappaqua Fire Department, established in 1910, provides firefighting services to the hamlet of Chappaqua. The fire department currently maintains two firehouses in Chappaqua.

Notable people
 Bill Ackman, investor and CEO & Founder of Pershing Square Capital Management
 Adam Arkin, American television, film, and stage actor, son of Alan Arkin
 Alan Arkin, Academy Award-winning actor, best known for his roles in such films as The In-Laws, Catch-22, The Heart Is a Lonely Hunter, Wait Until Dark, Argo, and Little Miss Sunshine.
 Bibi Besch, actress
 Dave Bickler, lead singer of Survivor
 Dan Biederman, urban redevelopment expert
 Mark Bomback, Screenwriter 
Tina L. Brozman, former Chief Justice of the Bankruptcy Court of the Southern District of New York
 Dan Bucatinsky, actor, producer, director, 2013  Primetime Emmy Award for Outstanding Guest Actor in a Drama Series as James Novak in Scandal.
 Bill and Hillary Clinton, former governor of Arkansas and U.S. president, and former first lady, U.S. senator, and United States secretary of state. The Clintons purchased their home in Chappaqua for $1.7 million in 1999, near the end of Bill Clinton's presidency.
 Renee Cox, Jamaican-American artist, photographer, political activist, and curator
 Ace Frehley, lead guitarist of Kiss
 Eric Fromm, tennis player
 Jean Craighead George, author of children's novels My Side of the Mountain (set in the Catskills) and Julie of the Wolves
 Bob Giraldi, television and commercial director
 Earl G. Graves, Jr., former NBA player
 Horace Greeley, reformer, politician, editor of the newspaper New York Tribune. He came to Chappaqua to live in a rural area, so in 1853 he bought  of land just east of the railroad. His land included upland pastures near present-day Aldridge Road, Greeley Hill, and the marshy fields now the site of the Bell Middle School fields and the shopping area along South Greeley Avenue.
 Nora Guthrie, daughter of Woody Guthrie and sister of Arlo Guthrie
 Roxanne Hart, American television, film and stage actress, appeared in Highlander, nurse on Chicago Hope among other roles.  (Her father, Edward Hart, was principal of Horace Greeley High School)
 David Ho, prominent HIV/AIDS researcher
 Ian Hunter, singer and guitar player with the band Mott The Hoople.
 Mary Beth Hurt, actress
 Paul F. Iams, founder of the Iams pet food company
 Kenneth T. Jackson, American historian
 Stu Jackson, former NBA head coach and current senior vice president of the NBA
 Herman Kahn, Cold War military strategist
 Heather Paige Kent, actress, podcaster and reality TV personality
 Jonathan Klein, Former president of CNN
 Peter Kunhardt, documentary film-maker
 Sandra Lee, host of Semi-Homemade Cooking with Sandra Lee, a show on the Food Network
 Brian Leiser, musician
 Paul Levitz, president of DC Comics
 Ferdinand Lundberg, author, journalist, economist
 Andrew McCabe, former acting director of the FBI
 William F. May, former chairman and chief executive of the American Can Company, co-founder of the Film Society of Lincoln Center.
 Richard McKelvey, noted political scientist and professor at California Institute of Technology
 Jordan Mechner, creator of Prince of Persia, also filmmaker
 Adam Mosseri, entrepreneur, head of Instagram
 Daniel O'Keefe, Reader's Digest editor and inventor of the secular holiday Festivus. His son, Dan O'Keefe, popularized the holiday in 1997 by writing it into the plot of the television sitcom Seinfeld.
 Frank R. Pierson, screenwriter and film director
 Robert L. "Nob" Rauch, a financier and flying disc sports executive
 Andy Rubin, technology pioneer (hand-held devices)
 Jay O. Sanders, an American character actor
 Peter Saul, painter
 Paul Schrader, writer and director
 John and Elizabeth Sherrill, Christian writers
 Ben Stiller, actor
 Bert Sugar, boxing historian
 Martin J. Sullivan, former president and former chief executive officer of American International Group, Inc.
 Rene Syler, journalist
 Christine Taylor, actress
 Jeff Van Gundy, former head coach of the Houston Rockets, former head coach of the New York Knicks
 Kevin Wade, screenwriter known best for Working Girl
 Dar Williams, singer, songwriter
 Vanessa Williams, Miss America 1984 beauty pageant, model, actress, singer
 Jenna Wolfe, sportscaster

References

External links

 Town of New Castle official website

Hamlets in New York (state)
Census-designated places in New York (state)
Census-designated places in Westchester County, New York
Hamlets in Westchester County, New York
New Castle, New York